is a 1989 side-scrolling beat-em-up released by Konami for the arcades. The players takes control of a duo (or squad) of undercover police officers who are assigned to rescue a group of kidnapped damsels from a crime boss and his army of punks.

Much like Konami's arcade version of Teenage Mutant Ninja Turtles (released during the same year), the game was available in a four-player dedicated cabinet, as well as a conversion kit that was available in 2-player and 4-player versions (meant for either Atari Games' Gauntlet or Konami's own Main Event). Unlike Ninja Turtles, each player character is identical, save for each one sporting a different palette swapped color. Crime Fighters was followed by a sequel titled Vendetta (released in Japan as Crime Fighters 2).

Gameplay
In the four-player versions, each player position has its own coin slot and each credit value adds around a hundred health points to that position which slowly drains one health point per tick (similar to Gauntlet). Players are able to accidentally hit each other and cause allies to drop their weapons permanently. After defeating the boss at the end of each level, if the game has more than one current player then the players are given a time limit that refreshes when a player is hurt and tells the players to fight as long as they want and lose health. While some health is granted at the end of the time limit, it is possible to lose more health than granted during this fight. The two-player version gives players a set number of lives and the health/timer system is replaced with a life meter and life counter similar to other beat-em-ups.

Players start in the first level of play, the subway. Upon knocking down the first few enemies, a large icon instructs player to kick downed opponents. There are buttons to punch and kick; pressing both performs a spinning jump kick. It is also possible to grab enemies and attack them, as well as kick them in the groin to stun them. Many enemies have weapons. Certain enemies always use knives to attack, while some "punk" enemies will have lead pipes and later enemies have handguns. Upon killing these enemies a player may pick up a weapon and use it indefinitely (including handguns in the two-player versions), however if players are hit once, the players will drop the item and it will disappear (except for the handguns in the four player versions, provided that they have ammo).

In the final stage, the final boss throws a key to the players and tells them to pick it up. Doing so will allow the boss to pull out a machine gun and shoot at the players. Should the player run out of health at this point, the game will end and a bad ending will be seen with the final boss telling the players to try again. The player however can choose not to get the key and kick (or shoot if the player has a handgun) the main villain repeatedly until he is defeated. Upon winning the game, player will then be subjected to a difficult final all boss round where the players must kill every boss in the game, who all appear on screen at once. If all the bosses are beaten, the game will either end or repeat endlessly.

Reception 
In Japan, Game Machine listed Crime Fighters on their August 1, 1989 issue as being the third most-successful table arcade unit at the time.

See also
Violent Storm

References

External links
Crime Fighters at Arcade History

1989 video games
Arcade video games
Arcade-only video games
Cooperative video games
Konami franchises
Konami beat 'em ups
Nintendo Switch games
PlayStation 4 games
Multiplayer and single-player video games
Side-scrolling beat 'em ups
Video games about police officers
Konami arcade games
Video games developed in Japan

ja:クライムファイターズ#クライムファイターズ
Hamster Corporation games